The Crumpets (French: Les Crumpets) is a French animated comedy television series produced by 4.21 Productions and distributed by Mediatoon Distribution. The show was adapted from the Petit Dernier books and Petite Pousse book authored by Didier Lévy, illustrated by Frédéric Benaglia, and published by Editions Sarbacane.

The show debuted on 21 December 2013. The third season, which premiered on 7 December 2015, and the fourth season, which premiered on 24 December 2017, are titled Teen Crumpets for international markets and focuses on the show's teenage characters. A 26-minute-long special, Les Crumpets, tu fais genre !, premiered on 8 March 2021.

Plot
The Crumpets are a big family with 142 children whose parents are Ma and Pa, and their paternal grandmother Granny and dog T-Bone also live with them. The youngest child, L'il One, rivals all his siblings and his father in getting his mother's love. He has a friendship with Granny. The show's characters beyond the Crumpet household include the neighboring McBrisk family consisting of a mother and her daughter, and Pa's wealthy brother, his wife, and their adoptive son.

Seasons 3 and 4 (Teen Crumpets) concentrate on the lives of the teenagers from the three families, as well as Marylin and Larry.

Cast
 P'tit Der / L'il One – Théo Benhamour (seasons 1-2), Victor Biavan (season 3), Wandrille Devisme (season 4) (French) and Joseph Pollock (English)
 Grand Ma / Granny – Michèle Garcia (French) and Mary O'Brady (English)
 Ma – Emmanuelle Hamet (French) and Melissa Chambers (English)
 Pa – Tom Novembre (French) and Marc Thompson (English)
 Rosénoire / Caprice – Rebecca Benhamour (French) and Kate Bristol (English)
 Pfff – Léonard Hamet (French) and Billy Bob Thompson (English)
 Midi and Midi-Cinq / Bother and Blister – Siméon Hamet, Antoine Raffin, Lucas Ripberger; Rosalie Hamet, Chiara Vergne (French), Erica Schroeder; Rebecca Soler (English)
 King – Antoine Raffin, Lucas Ripberger (French) and Alex Luscomb (English)
 Têtenlair / Ditzy – Rosalie Hamet (French) and Erica Schroeder (English)
 Oulala / Ohoh – Siméon Hamet (French) and Rebecca Soler (English)
 Triceps – Kelly Marot (French) and Rebecca Soler (English)
 Bozart / Fynartz – Léon Plazol (French) and Erica Schroeder (English)
 Grangran / Grownboy – Olivier Podesta (French) and Jason Griffith (English)
 Madame Dame / Ms. McBrisk – Marie-France Ducloz (French) and Erica Schroeder (English)
 Cassandra – Kelly Marot (French) and Nicola Barber (English)
 Tonton Karl / Uncle Hurry – Luq Hamet (French) and Eli James (English)
 Tata Greta / Aunt Harried – Juliette Degenne (French) and Rebecca Soler (English)
 Gunther / Cordless – Olivier Podesta (French) and Billy Bob Thompson (English)
 Steve – Nicolas Vitiello (French) and Darren Dunstan (English)
 Marylin – Yoann Sover (French)
 Hervé / Larry – Léon Plazol (French)
 Miley Virus - Cindy Lemineur (French)
 Reuh - Charles Germain (French)

Development
In 2008, the Petit Dernier and Petite Pousse books were discovered by Éric (aka Raoul) Magrangeas, who became interested in adapting them to a cartoon. In 2009, 4.21 Productions signed a contract with Editions Sarbacane to produce the cartoon adaptation. Most of the animation was done in France with the remainder outsourced to China. The main themes in seasons one and two are family affairs, neighborhood quarrels, and social topics.

Mediatoon signed a worldwide distribution agreement with 4.21 Productions in 2013. The English dub for the first 52 episodes was recorded in studios in the United Kingdom and New York, United States. The English dub for Teen Crumpets was recorded by The Kitchen studio in Miami, Florida.

Awards
In April 2018, Teen Crumpets won the Cartoons on the Bay "Teens 12+" Pulcinella award in Italy.

In October 2018, Teen Crumpets (with the episode "Music Hall Therapy") won the TV Series Jury Prize at TOFUZI: International Festival of Animated Films in Georgia.

References

External links
4.21 Productions show summary
Les Crumpets on TV5MONDE
Les Crumpets on RTBF OUFtivi
2015 English dub Kickstarter page with character descriptions
The Crumpets on Mediatoon
Teen Crumpets on Mediatoon
The Crumpets on YouTube
Les Crumpets on YouTube

2010s French animated television series
2020s French animated television series
2013 French television series debuts
Canal+ original programming
Animated television series about families
French children's animated comedy television series
LGBT-related animated series
Animated television series about siblings
French television shows based on children's books